Maxime Lagacé (born January 12, 1993) is a Canadian professional ice hockey goaltender who is currently playing for the Syracuse Crunch in the American Hockey League (AHL) while under contract to the Tampa Bay Lightning of the National Hockey League (NHL).

Playing career
As a youth, Lagacé played in the 2005 and 2006 Quebec International Pee-Wee Hockey Tournaments with a minor ice hockey team from Rive-Nord.

Junior
Lagacé began his junior years with the Quebec Major Junior Hockey League in 2010. His first team was the P.E.I. Rocket for three years, finishing with a total record of 33–80–6 in 107 games and a .873 save percentage average. Lagacé also appeared in his only junior playoff game with the Rocket.

On July 23, 2012, Lagacé signed a three-year, $1.83 million entry level contract with the Dallas Stars. Lagacé had participated in the Stars' Development Camp earlier that summer.

Lagacé was transferred to the Cape Breton Screaming Eagles in 2013, where he only played eight games with a 3–3–1 record and a .887 save percentage. He was then traded to the Shawinigan Cataractes and the Sherbrooke Phoenix in the same season.

Professional

Dallas Stars
Maxime Lagacé entered the American Hockey League under his contract with the Dallas Stars, playing for their affiliate Texas Stars. He had only played a single game with no wins or losses, as he was pulled in the midst of the game.

Lagacé signed with the Missouri Mavericks of the ECHL in the 2014–15 season, but he was eventually traded to the Bakersfield Condors, where he would make his personal best save percentage of .915. He would then return with the Stars in the AHL the following year, playing in 36 games with a 19–10–3 record and .913 save percentage. The Stars would send Lagacé back down to the ECHL with their affiliate, the Idaho Steelheads. He would sign a one-year, two-way, $600,000 extension with the Dallas Stars in that same year.

Vegas Golden Knights
Lagacé played two more seasons in the AHL with the Texas Stars before signing with the NHL expansion team, the Vegas Golden Knights, as a free agent in 2017. Lagacé started with their AHL affiliate, the Chicago Wolves prior to getting called up to Vegas on first on October 15, 2017, due to injuries to Marc-André Fleury and then on October 23 when Malcolm Subban was injured. His first National Hockey League game was on October 30, appearing in a 6–3 loss to the New York Islanders, allowing four goals on eleven shots in 25 minutes of playing time after replacing the injured Oscar Dansk. The following night, Lagacé made his first NHL start at Madison Square Garden against the New York Rangers, a 6–4 loss in which he stopped 32 of 37 shots. Lagacé got his first NHL win against the Ottawa Senators in a 5–4 game on November 4 while making 24 saves for the Golden Knights. On November 6, Lagacé lost his first shootout against the Toronto Maple Leafs with a 3–4 loss. On December 10, Lagacé was reassigned to the Chicago Wolves following Marc-André Fleury's return from the injured reserve. However, he was recalled back to the NHL on February 10, 2018, after Malcolm Subban was placed on injured reserve. He was reassigned to the AHL on March 15, 2018. Lagacé stayed in the AHL until Subban suffered a lower body injury in practice during the Western Conference Final, where he was then called up to serve as Fleury's backup.

Lagacé began the 2018–19 season with the Chicago Wolves after being cut from the Knights training camp. After playing in 18 games and posting a 9–6–0 record, he was recalled to the NHL on January 9. Lagacé played one game during his recall, a loss to the Carolina Hurricanes on January 30, before being reassigned to the Wolves on February 8. During the 2019 Calder Cup playoffs, Lagacé recorded the first playoff goal by a goaltender in AHL history to help the Wolves win 5–2 over the San Diego Gulls. Lagacé made a save and was the last Wolves player to touch the puck, as a San Diego player inadvertently shot the puck into his own net.

Boston Bruins
On July 1, 2019, Lagacé left the Golden Knights as a free agent following the franchise’s first two seasons. He then signed a one-year, two-way $700,000 contract with the Boston Bruins. In the 2019–20 season, Lagacé was assigned to Boston's AHL affiliate, the Providence Bruins, appearing in 33 games. Helping Providence to the second-best record in the AHL, he posted a 22–7–3 recorded with a 2.37 goals-against average, a .919 save percentage and five shutouts. His win total, goals-against average, save percentage and shutout total were all AHL career highs. He joined the Boston Bruins roster for the 2020 Stanley Cup playoffs, however did not feature in a game.

Pittsburgh Penguins
At the conclusion of his contract with the Bruins, Lagacé left as a free agent to sign a one-year, two-way contract with the Pittsburgh Penguins on October 10, 2020. 

In his debut with the Penguins on May 8, 2021, Lagacé recorded his first career shutout against the Buffalo Sabres in the final game of the regular season. Stopping all 29 shots, Lagacé became the first goaltender in the history of the Penguins franchise to record a shutout in their first game.

Tampa Bay Lightning
Becoming a free agent the next off-season, Lagacé joined the Tampa Bay Lightning on July 28, 2021 on a one-year, two-way contract.

After starting the season for AHL affiliate Syracuse Crunch, Lagacé was recalled to the Lightning on December 27, 2021, along with teammate Hugo Alnefelt. This was in response to both Lightning goalies contracting COVID-19 and needing to sit out. Lagacé started for the Lightning the next day at home against the Montreal Canadiens. Lagacé made 27 saves on 31 shots, as the Lightning won 5-4 in overtime. He started again on December 30 against the Florida Panthers, but was removed at the end of the second period after allowing 6 goals on 27 shots. Alnefelt came in for Lagacé in the 3rd period, making his NHL debut in the process.

Personal life
Lagacé was born to Manon Dallaire and Gilles Lagacé. He has one younger brother, and 10 other family members. Lagacé speaks fluent French and English.

Career statistics

References

External links

1993 births
Living people
Bakersfield Condors (1998–2015) players
Canadian ice hockey goaltenders
Cape Breton Screaming Eagles players
Chicago Wolves players
Ice hockey people from Quebec
Idaho Steelheads (ECHL) players
Missouri Mavericks players
P.E.I. Rocket players
People from Capitale-Nationale
Pittsburgh Penguins players
Providence Bruins players
Shawinigan Cataractes players
Sherbrooke Phoenix players
Syracuse Crunch players
Tampa Bay Lightning players
Texas Stars players
Undrafted National Hockey League players
Vegas Golden Knights players
Wilkes-Barre/Scranton Penguins players